Sam Joseph Dennis Sargeant (born 23 September 1997) is an English professional footballer who plays as a goalkeeper for Leyton Orient.

Early life
Sargeant was born in Greenwich, London.

Career
In November 2015, after featuring on the bench for Leyton Orient, Sargeant joined Redbridge on a work experience loan. Sargeant made his first-team debut, and kept a clean sheet, in Orient's 1–0 win away to Yeovil Town on 7 May 2016. After spending most of the 2016–17 season on Orient's substitutes' bench as back-up to Alex Cisak, Sargeant made his second appearance in the 2–1 defeat at home to Carlisle United on 4 February 2017.

In early January 2018, Sargeant moved to Isthmian League Premier Division club Margate on a 28-day loan. After four appearances, keeping two clean sheets, he was recalled to Orient after Dean Brill picked up an injury in training.

On 9 February, Sargeant signed on loan to Leatherhead until the end of the 2017–18 season. He joined Barnet on loan for the first two months of the 2021–22 National League season, returning to Orient after ten appearances.

On 11 January 2022, Sargeant joined National League side Wealdstone on a seven-day emergency loan deal due to a suspension to first choice goalkeeper George Wickens. His sole appearance came in a 1–0 defeat away to Boreham Wood before leaving the club later that week.

On 1 July 2022, Sargeant signed a new one-year contract to stay at Leyton Orient. Manager Richie Wellens said, "Sometimes when you’re looking for a number two keeper, chemistry is important. Sarge is a really good character, trains very well, and can be relied upon if we need him."

Career statistics

Honours
Leyton Orient
FA Trophy runner-up: 2018–19

References

External links
Sam Sargeant profile at the Leyton Orient F.C. website

1997 births
Living people
Footballers from Greenwich
English footballers
Association football goalkeepers
Leyton Orient F.C. players
Redbridge F.C. players
Margate F.C. players
Leatherhead F.C. players
Barnet F.C. players
Wealdstone F.C. players
English Football League players
National League (English football) players
Isthmian League players